Arroyo de Abejuela is a river of the Province of Albacete, Spain. It is a small river that crosses the municipalities of Letur and Férez. It is a tributary of the La Mora Brook.

Course
In its upper course, it is usually dry during the summer. Beyond the village, it turns west, below Bermeja (921), where there is a mill. It reaches the Férez Township, bordering the highlands of La Solana, to the north, before emptying into the La Mora stream.

External links
Map of the river's location

Rivers of Spain
Rivers of the Province of Albacete
Rivers of Castilla–La Mancha